DZEC (1062 AM) Radyo Agila is a radio station owned and operated by the Eagle Broadcasting Corporation in the Philippines. The station's studio is located at EBC Bldg., 25 Central Ave., Diliman, Quezon City, and its transmitter is located at Brgy. Paliwas, Obando, Bulacan. The station operates daily from 4:00 AM to 12:00 MN.

History
DZEC was established on April 26, 1968, in Manila under Eagle Broadcasting Corporation. The station was then broadcasting on the frequency of 1050 kHz AM featuring news, public affairs, public service, entertainment, educational and music programs.

In November 1978, DZEC reassigned to the present frequency of 1062 kHz in response to the adoption of the 9 kHz spacing on AM radio stations implemented by the Geneva Frequency Plan of 1975.

Since then, DZEC began expanding into other parts of Luzon, with DZEL in Lucena City (1973) and DWIN in Dagupan, Northern Luzon (1976).

During August 1987, however, DZEC was one of the AM stations in the Metropolis ordered by the National Telecommunications Commission to cease broadcasts for a few months, after getting notoriety for airing controversial right-wing propaganda and commentary programs that were critical of the Corazon Aquino administration.
The station returned on January 1, 1988.

In 1988, it further expanded and acquired local radio stations in Visayas and Mindanao, with DYFX in Cebu and DXED in Davao, covering the 4 said key cities in the Philippines.

In late April 2001 DZEC was the only station airing live coverage of the Pro-Estrada Rally (also known as EDSA III). That rally ended in a failed siege of the Malacañang Palace on May 1, 2001. When Net 25 became known for blow-by-blow accounts of Philippine Events, as "DZEC Radyo Agila 1062" as several of its programs such as "Agila Reports", "Liwanagin Natin", and "Con Todos Recados" began to be aired on the channel, one of the first to pioneer the "TeleRadyo" concept.

In late 2006, EBC briefly dropped the "Radyo Agila" brand and rebranded as simply "DZEC" with the slogan, "Ang Radyo ng Pamilya", and later in 2008, DZEC was launched its slogan as "Ang Himpilan ng Maligayang Tahanan".

DZEC holds the distinction for being the first KBP Golden Dove Awards People's Choice for AM Station winning by a landslide margin over its nearest competitor. DZEC remains as the overwhelming choice of radio listeners reigning as the most listened to AM Station for two consecutive years (2009 / 2010).

It was in 2011 when DZEC halted its transmissions after the wake of Typhoon "Pedring" (Nesat). Despite this, The station's programs continued to air on other relay stations. But after a year and a half of hibernation, DZEC went back on air returned as a test broadcast using the station's feed that only airs until 10 pm. On February 12, 2013, Along with Net 25 and Pinas FM 95.5, its studios moved from Maligaya Building 2 in EDSA to newly built EBC Building along Central Ave. in Diliman. Followed by the reinstatement of the legendary "Radyo Agila" brand, it formally resumed full operations on April 26, 2013, during the 45th anniversary of Eagle Broadcasting Corporation.

Livestreaming features of Net 25 (and its radio station DZEC) returned last January 2, 2014, after a 5-year break.

In January 2023, DZEC became the No. 1 AM radio station in Metro Manila on Weekday afternoon as well as on Weekends, based on the latest Nielsen survey.

Notable personalities
Rey Langit
Rodante Marcoleta
Ali Sotto

References

DZEC
News and talk radio stations in the Philippines
Iglesia ni Cristo
Radio stations established in 1968